Love Hotel may refer to:

 Love hotel, a short-stay hotel operated primarily for sexual activities
 The Love Hotel, a 1933 German film directed by Carl Lamac
 Love Hotel (1968 film), a Japanese pink film directed by Shin'ya Yamamoto
 Love Hotel (1985 film), a Japanese Roman porno film directed by Shinji Sōmai